Opisthoteuths hardyi is a lesser-known octopus species. It was described in 2002 from a male caught off the Shag Rocks, which are far south in the Atlantic Ocean near the Falkland Islands. 

It had some enlarged suckers, which is typical for male octopuses belonging to Opisthoteuthis. It also had a web connecting its long arms, which is common for cirrate octopuses and some incirrate octopuses.

However, the true depth range is wider.

References

Further reading

Octopuses
Fauna of South Georgia and the South Sandwich Islands
Molluscs of the Atlantic Ocean
Molluscs described in 2002